Thomas Smellie may refer to:
 Thomas Smellie (politician)
 Thomas Smellie (minister)